Michael Joseph Francis Quinn (November 19, 1851 – December 6, 1903) was a Canadian politician.

Born in Kingston, Canada West, Quinn was a lawyer by profession. He was elected to the House of Commons of Canada for the Quebec electoral district of St. Anne in the 1896 federal election. A Conservative, he was defeated in 1900.

Electoral history

References
 

1851 births
1903 deaths
Conservative Party of Canada (1867–1942) MPs
Members of the House of Commons of Canada from Quebec
People from Kingston, Ontario